Berawila is a village in Sri Lanka. It is located within Sabaragamuwa Province.

See also
List of settlements in Sabaragamuwa Province

External links

Populated places in Sabaragamuwa Province